Latvia is a country on the east coast of the Baltic Sea, in the middle of the three Baltic countries. 
Latvia has been engaged in meteorological observation activities since the 19th century. Before 1900, Latvia established weather stations such as Riga and Ventspils.

Latvia's unique topography leads to a large climate difference between the east and west sides of the country; the west of the country is close to the Baltic Sea, so it has the characteristics of a maritime climate; while the east of the country has a very obvious continental climate. Among them, Daugavpils, Rūjiena and Zosēni located in the east of the country once experienced extremely cold temperatures below . On the contrary, the western coastal areas of the country are not particularly cold in winter due to the influence of warm currents, and it is relatively rare for winters to be below , while in several coastal cities of the country such as Liepāja

Maximum temperatures

Minimum temperatures

References

External links

Weather extremes of Earth
Latvia